is a 1955 black and white Japanese film drama directed by Yuzo Kawashima.

Cast 
 Tôru Abe as Gô Momoyama
 Shinsuke Ashida as Gorô Mitsuboshi
 Seizaburô Kawazu as Katsumi Kyôgoku
 Mie Kitahara as Yukino Nakamachi
 Tatsuya Mihashi as Kan Mimurodo - Konî
 Hisaya Morishige (Narrator)

References

External links 
 

Japanese black-and-white films
1955 films
Films directed by Yuzo Kawashima
Nikkatsu films
Japanese drama films
1955 drama films
1950s Japanese films